Grammodora is a monotypic moth genus in the family Lasiocampidae erected by Per Olof Christopher Aurivillius in 1927. Its only species, Grammodora nigrolineata, had been described by the same author but in 1890.

References

Lasiocampidae
Monotypic moth genera